Parvitragulus is an extinct monospecific genus of hypertragulid ruminant endemic to North America. Fossils have been found in Wyoming, Nebraska, and Texas.

Parvitragulus were primitive and ancient ruminants, resembling small deer or musk deer, although they were more closely related to modern chevrotains. Its diet is stated to be that of a frugivore.

References

Eocene even-toed ungulates
Priabonian genus extinctions
Eocene mammals of North America
Prehistoric even-toed ungulate genera